Line 3 (Red) is one of the six lines that make up the São Paulo Metro and one of the thirteen lines that make up the Metropolitan Rail Transportation Network. It runs between Palmeiras-Barra Funda and Corinthians-Itaquera. It was formerly called the East-West Line. Line 3 is the busiest in the system.

History
But after a lengthy debate, it was decided that it would be constructed on the surface, taking advantage of the old Rede Ferroviária Federal train bed and sharing  of its lines—a move that prevented many expropriations.

Construction began in 1972. The stretch between Guaianases and Calmon Viana, in Poá was planned to be built in a second phase, making full use the rail bed. The strength of this design change would be a cost equivalent to one third of the original budget. Because of international trends that dictate that the rail for metro systems used for urban transport be made exclusive to the metro, the design was changed again.

It was up to the Rede Ferroviária Federal (predecessor of CPTM) to modernize this passage. For this reason, the line opened already overloaded. Once this impasse was resolved, construction began on the western section. On March 10, 1979 the first stretch, between Sé and Brás stations was opened. In the west, the line ended in Barra Funda. The current configuration is the same since 1988. The current record demand was made on November 7, 2008, with the transport of 1,468,935 people. On May 2–3, 2009 the stretch between Anhangabaú and Santa Cecília stations was closed to allow for the use of a tunnel boring machine being used for the extension project of Line 4 (Yellow).
In 2010 work began on the installation of glass doors on the Line 3 platforms, starting with the Vila Matilde, Carrão and Penha stations.

Expansion
An expansion is planned from Palmeiras-Barra Funda to Pio XI. Another extension is planned from Corinthians-Itaquera to Jacu Pêssego.

Stations

References

Line 03
Sao 03
Railway lines opened in 1979